from the Tokyo Institute of Technology, Tokyo, Japan was named Fellow of the Institute of Electrical and Electronics Engineers (IEEE) in 2012 for contributions to high-gain and high-efficiency millimeter-wave planar waveguide slot arrays.

References

Fellow Members of the IEEE
Living people
Year of birth missing (living people)
Place of birth missing (living people)
Academic staff of Tokyo Institute of Technology